Louka u Litvínova is a municipality and village in Most District in the Ústí nad Labem Region of the Czech Republic. It has about 700 inhabitants.

History

The first written mention of Louka u Litvínova is from 1289.

Sights
The main landmark is the Chapel of Saint Anthony of Padua. It was built in 1834 from the money of local farmers.

References

Villages in Most District
Villages in the Ore Mountains